More About the Children of Noisy Village is a Swedish film which was released to cinemas in Sweden on 5 September 1987, directed by Lasse Hallström, based on the books about The Six Bullerby Children by Astrid Lindgren.

It is a sequel to The Children of Noisy Village which premiered the year before. The two filmed were then reworked into a seven-episode television series that was broadcast in 1989.

Cast
 Linda Bergström as Lisa
 Crispin Dickson Wendenius as Lasse
 Henrik Larsson as Bosse
 Ellen Demérus as Britta
 Anna Sahlin as Anna
 Harald Lönnbro as Olle
 Tove Edfeldt as Kerstin

References

External links
 
 
 More About the Children of Noisy Village at astridlindgren.se 
 
 

1987 films
Swedish children's films
Films based on works by Astrid Lindgren
Films directed by Lasse Hallström
Swedish sequel films
1980s Swedish films